The 2016 European Canoe Sprint Olympic Qualifier took place in Duisburg, Germany on 18 & 19 May 2016. It served as the sole Olympic qualification regatta for European sprint canoeists that did not claim Rio 2016 berths at the 2015 ICF Canoe Sprint World Championships.

This event shared the venue with, and was held concurrently with the 2016 ICF Paracanoe World Championships.

Olympic qualification
Four athlete quota places were provided in the men's C2 1000m (two NOCs). For all other events, two athlete quota places were provided in each (two NOCs per single-man event, one NOC per double-man event).

Medal summary

Men

Women

Medal table

References

External links
 Results

Canoe Sprint Championships
2016 in canoeing
International sports competitions hosted by Germany